Daniel Kilgore (May 24, 1794December 12, 1851) was a U.S. Representative from Ohio.

Born at Kings Creek, Virginia (now West Virginia), Kilgore received a liberal schooling.
He moved to Cadiz, Ohio, and served as member of the Ohio Senate from 1828 to 1832.

Kilgore was elected as a Jacksonian to the Twenty-third Congress to fill the vacancy caused by the resignation of Humphrey H. Leavitt. Kilgore was again elected as a Jacksonian to the Twenty-fourth Congress. He was reelected, this time as a Democrat, to the Twenty-fifth Congress. He subsequently served from December 1, 1834, until July 4, 1838, when he resigned from politics.

Kilgore moved to Steubenville, Ohio in 1850, and was elected president of the Steubenville and Indiana Railroad. He died while visiting New York City. He died on December 12, 1851.

References

 

1794 births
1851 deaths
People from Hancock County, West Virginia
People from Cadiz, Ohio
Democratic Party Ohio state senators
19th-century American railroad executives
Jacksonian members of the United States House of Representatives from Ohio
19th-century American politicians
Democratic Party members of the United States House of Representatives from Ohio